CFX may refer to:
Central Florida Expressway Authority
ANSYS CFX, a computation fluid dynamics program
Xaverian Brothers or Congregation of St. Francis Xavier
AMD CrossFireX, a computer graphics multiprocessing technology
Compact form factor, a form factor of power supply unit (computer)
Californium neutron flux multiplier